The New You! is the fourth album by the London-based acid jazz band Corduroy, released in 1997. "The Joker Is Wild" was released as a single and reached No. 80 in the UK Singles Chart in March 1997.

Reception
AllMusic awarded the album 4.5 stars, with S. T. Erlewine writing: "Working from the same acid-jazz foundation that informed their previous records, the band has added slightly ironic flourishes of lounge music and movie soundtracks while beginning to develop a sophisticated sense of pop craft, largely modeled after Steely Dan." On the other hand, Gill Whyte from NME rated the record 1/10, writing: "From the middle-class funk of Steely Dan meets The Kids From Fame, to the 'hilarious' '60s B-movie soundtracks, complete with Tijuana brass, Corduroy display an embarrassingly indulgent use of irony and ability to tell everyone else's gags very badly indeed."

Track listing

Personnel 
 Ben Addison – vocals, drums
 Scott Addison – vocals, keyboards
 Simon Nelson-Smith – guitars
 Richard Searle – bass guitar
 Donald Gamble – percussion
 Sid Singh – percussion
 Mike Smith – saxophone
 Dennis Rollins – trombone
 Sid Gauld – trumpet
 The Duke Quartet – strings

Chart positions

Single charts

References 

1997 albums
Corduroy (band) albums